Donald McAlpine Straw (November 22, 1896 – July 31, 1961) was a professional American football player for the Detroit Tigers and Detroit Heralds. He attended Washington & Jefferson College.  He attended Central High School in Detroit, Michigan.

References

1896 births
1961 deaths
Central High School (Detroit) alumni
Players of American football from Detroit
American football guards
Washington & Jefferson Presidents football players
Detroit Heralds players
Detroit Tigers (NFL) players